Florica Musicescu (21 May 1887, Iaşi–19 March 1969, Bucharest) was a renowned Romanian pianist and musical pedagogue, daughter of the renowned composer, conductor and musicologist Gavriil Musicescu.

She taught piano music for many decades at the Bucharest Conservatory (known as Royal Music Academy prior to World War II). For her masterful guidance and mentorship, she is considered to be one of the founders of the Romanian School of Piano Music. Many of the famous pianists of the 20th century emerged from this school: Mihai Brediceanu, Paul Dan, Dan Grigore, Mindru Katz, Dinu Lipatti, Myriam Marbe, Radu Lupu, Svetla Protich, Madeleine Cantacuzene, Sorin Enăchescu, Maria Fotino, Corneliu Gheorghiu, Marietta Orlov, Shulamith Shapira and Tamás Vesmás.

Notes

External links
 Dinu Lipatti (1917-1950)- a biography (the Lipatti-Haskil Foundation)
 Radu Lupu (born 1945)- Biography (by Decca)
Musical and Choreographic Calendar
Who’s who in Romania: Dan Grigore 

1887 births
1969 deaths
Musicians from Iași
Romanian classical musicians
Romanian classical pianists
Romanian women pianists
Academic staff of the National University of Music Bucharest
20th-century classical pianists
Women music educators
Women classical pianists
20th-century women pianists